Timecode is a 2000 American experimental film written and directed by Mike Figgis and featuring a large ensemble cast, including Salma Hayek, Stellan Skarsgård, Jeanne Tripplehorn, Suzy Nakamura, Kyle MacLachlan, Saffron Burrows, Holly Hunter, Julian Sands, Xander Berkeley, Leslie Mann and Mía Maestro.

The film is constructed from four continuous 93-minute takes that were filmed simultaneously by four cameras; the screen is divided into quarters, and the four shots are shown simultaneously. The film depicts several groups of people in Los Angeles as they interact and conflict while preparing for the shooting of a movie in a production office. The dialogue was largely improvised, and the sound mix of the film is designed so that the most significant of the four sequences on screen dominates the soundtrack at any given moment.

Plot 
The film takes place in and around a film production company office, and involves several interweaving plot threads which include a young actress named Rose who tries to score a screen test from her secret boyfriend Alex Green, a noted but disillusioned director. Meanwhile, Rose's tryst with him is discovered by her girlfriend Lauren, an insanely jealous businesswoman who plants a microphone in Rose's purse and spends most of the time in the back of her limousine parked outside the office building listening in on Rose's conversations. Elsewhere, Alex's wife Emma is seen with a therapist debating about asking him for a divorce. In the meantime, numerous film industry types pitch ideas for the next big hit film.

Cast

In the first run through, Headly's role as Dava Adair was performed by Laurie Metcalf.

Production 
The movie was shot with four hand-held digital cameras, in one take, on the sixteenth performance. Largely improvised, Figgis provided the actors with blank, four-staff music manuscript paper, with each octave representing a camera view at that particular moment in time, up to the 93 minutes of camera capacity. The actors themselves personally kept track of the activities occurring in other camera points of view that were relative to their performance.

Rehearsals were single-take performances, filmed over fifteen days. Filmed in the mornings, with the actors fully involved, the footage was reviewed and discussed in the afternoons. Four separate monitors replayed each camera point of view simultaneously. The first rehearsal recording was included as a bonus feature on the film's 2000 DVD release.

The film's action ends with closing activity in three quadrants and the following statement (no capitalization beyond film's title) in the fourth quadrant:

Reception
The review aggregator website Rotten Tomatoes gave Timecode a rating of 68% from 81 reviews. The website's consensus reads, "Not much of a story, but the execution is interesting." Metacritic gave the film a score of 65 out of 100, based on 31 critic reviews.

See also
 List of films featuring surveillance
 Minimalist film

References

External links
 
 
 
 
 Los Angeles, the City in Cinema: Timecode essay by Colin Marshall on Vimeo

2000 films
2000 drama films
American drama films
American independent films
2000 independent films
Films directed by Mike Figgis
Camcorder films
One-shot films
American avant-garde and experimental films
Screen Gems films
Films scored by Anthony Marinelli
Self-reflexive films
Films about time
Hyperlink films
2000s avant-garde and experimental films
Films about Hollywood, Los Angeles
2000s American films
Films set in Los Angeles
Films set in offices
2000s English-language films